Rhodosoma is a genus of tunicates.

References 

Enterogona
Tunicate genera